Lake-effect snow is produced during cooler atmospheric conditions when a cold air mass moves across long expanses of warmer lake water. The lower layer of air, heated by the lake water, picks up water vapor from the lake and rises through colder air. The vapor then freezes and is deposited on the leeward (downwind) shores.

The same effect also occurs over bodies of saline water, when it is termed ocean-effect or bay-effect snow. The effect is enhanced when the moving air mass is uplifted by the orographic influence of higher elevations on the downwind shores. This uplifting can produce narrow but very intense bands of precipitation, which deposit at a rate of many inches of snow each hour, often resulting in a large amount of total snowfall.

The areas affected by lake-effect snow are called snowbelts. These include areas east of the Great Lakes in North America, the west coasts of northern Japan, the Kamchatka Peninsula in Russia, and areas near the Great Salt Lake, Black Sea, Caspian Sea, Baltic Sea, Adriatic Sea, and North Sea.

Lake-effect blizzards are the blizzard-like conditions resulting from lake-effect snow. Under certain conditions, strong winds can accompany lake-effect snows creating blizzard-like conditions; however, the duration of the event is often slightly less than that required for a blizzard warning in both the US and Canada.

If the air temperature is low enough to keep the precipitation frozen, it falls as lake-effect snow. If not, then it falls as lake-effect rain. For lake-effect rain or snow to form, the air moving across the lake must be significantly cooler than the surface air (which is likely to be near the temperature of the water surface).

Formation 

Some key elements are required to form lake-effect precipitation and which determine its characteristics: instability, fetch, wind shear, upstream moisture, upwind lakes, synoptic (large)-scale forcing, orography/topography, and snow or ice cover.

Instability 
Atmospheric lapse rate and convective depth are directly affected by both the mesoscale lake environment and the synoptic environment; a deeper convective depth with increasingly steep lapse rates and a suitable moisture level allow for thicker, taller lake-effect precipitation clouds and naturally a much greater precipitation rate.

Fetch 
The distance that an air mass travels over a body of water is called fetch. Because most lakes are irregular in shape, different angular degrees of travel yield different distances; typically, a fetch of at least  is required to produce lake-effect precipitation. Generally, the larger the fetch, the more precipitation produced. Larger fetches provide the boundary layer with more time to become saturated with water vapor and for heat energy to move from the water to the air.

Wind shear 
Directional shear is one of the most important factors governing the development of squalls; environments with weak directional shear typically produce more intense squalls than those with higher shear levels. If directional shear between the surface and the height in the atmosphere at which the barometric pressure measures  is greater than 60°, nothing more than flurries can be expected. If the directional shear between the body of water and the vertical height at which the pressure measures  is between 30° and 60°, weak lake-effect bands are possible. In environments where the shear is less than 30°, strong, well organized bands can be expected.

Speed shear is less critical but should be relatively uniform. The wind-speed difference between the surface and vertical height at which the pressure reads  should be no greater than  so as to prevent the upper portions of the band from shearing off. However, assuming the surface to  winds are uniform, a faster overall velocity works to transport moisture more quickly from the water, and the band then travels much farther inland.

Upstream moisture 
A lower upstream relative humidity lake effect makes condensation, clouds, and precipitation more difficult to form. The opposite is true if the upstream moisture has a high relative humidity, allowing lake-effect condensation, cloud, and precipitation to form more readily and in a greater quantity.

Upwind lakes 
Any large body of water upwind impacts lake-effect precipitation to the lee of a downwind lake by adding moisture or pre-existing lake-effect bands, which can reintensify over the downwind lake. Upwind lakes do not always lead to an increase of precipitation downwind.

Synoptic forcing 
Vorticity advection aloft and large upscale ascent help increase mixing and the convective depth, while cold air advection lowers the temperature and increases instability.

Orography and topography 
Typically, lake-effect precipitation increases with elevation to the lee of the lake as topographic forcing squeezes out precipitation and dries out the squall much faster.

Snow and ice cover 
As a lake gradually freezes over, its ability to produce lake-effect precipitation decreases for two reasons. Firstly, the open ice-free liquid surface area of the lake shrinks. This reduces fetch distances. Secondly, the water temperature nears freezing, reducing overall latent heat energy available to produce squalls. To end the production of lake-effect precipitation, a complete freeze is often not necessary.

Even when precipitation is not produced, cold air passing over warmer water may produce cloud cover. Fast-moving mid-latitude cyclones, known as Alberta clippers, often cross the Great Lakes. After the passage of a cold front, winds tend to switch to the northwest, and a frequent pattern is for a long-lasting low-pressure area to form over the Canadian Maritimes, which may pull cold northwestern air across the Great Lakes for a week or more, commonly identified with the negative phase of the North Atlantic Oscillation (NAO). Since the prevailing winter winds tend to be colder than the water for much of the winter, the southeastern shores of the lakes are almost constantly overcast, leading to the use of the term "the Great Gray Funk" as a synonym for winter. These areas allegedly contain populations that suffer from high rates of seasonal affective disorder, a type of psychological depression thought to be caused by lack of light.

Great Lakes region

United States 

Cold winds in the winter typically prevail from the northwest in the Great Lakes region, producing the most dramatic lake-effect snowfalls on the southern and eastern shores of the Great Lakes. This lake effect results in much greater snowfall amounts on the southern and eastern shores compared to the northern and western shores of the Great Lakes.

The most affected areas include the Upper Peninsula of Michigan; Northern New York and Central New York; particularly the Tug Hill Region, Western New York; Northwestern Pennsylvania; Northeastern Ohio; southwestern Ontario and central Ontario; Northeastern Illinois (along the shoreline of Lake Michigan); northwestern and north central Indiana (mostly between Gary and Elkhart); northern Wisconsin (near Lake Superior); and West Michigan.

Lake-effect snows on the Tug Hill plateau (east of Lake Ontario) can frequently set daily records for snowfall in the United States. The snowiest portions of the Tug Hill, near the junction of the towns of Montague, Osceola, Redfield, and Worth, average over 300" of snow annually.

From February 3–12, 2007, a lake-effect snow event left  of snow in 10 days at North Redfield on the Tug Hill Plateau. Other examples major prolonged lake effect snowstorms on the Tug Hill include December 27, 2001, - January 1, 2002, when 127" of snow fell in six days in Montague, January 10–14, 1997, when 110.5" of snow fell in five days in North Redfield, and January 15–22, 1940, when over eight feet of snow fell in eight days at Barnes Corners.

Syracuse, New York, directly south of the Tug Hill Plateau, receives significant lake-effect snow from Lake Ontario, and averages  of snow per year, which is enough snowfall to be considered one of the "snowiest" large cities in America.

A small amount of lake-effect snow from the Finger Lakes falls in upstate New York, as well. If the wind blows almost the entire length of either Cayuga Lake or Seneca Lake, Ithaca or Watkins Glen, respectively, can have a small lake-effect snowstorm.

Lake Erie produces a similar effect for a zone stretching from the eastern suburbs of Cleveland through Erie to Buffalo. Remnants of lake-effect snows from Lake Erie have been observed to reach as far south as Garrett County, Maryland, and as far east as Geneva, New York. Because it is not as deep as the other lakes, Erie warms rapidly in the spring and summer, and is frequently the only Great Lake to freeze over in winter. Once frozen, the resulting ice cover alleviates lake-effect snow downwind of the lake. Based on stable isotope evidence from lake sediment coupled with historical records of increasing lake-effect snow, global warming has been predicted to result in a further increase in lake-effect snow.

A very large snowbelt in the United States exists on the Upper Peninsula of Michigan, near the cities of Houghton, Marquette, and Munising. These areas typically receive  of snow each season. Lake Superior and Lake Huron rarely freeze because of their size and depth; hence, lake-effect snow can fall continually in the Upper Peninsula and Canadian snowbelts during the winter. Main areas of the Upper Peninsula snow belt include the Keweenaw Peninsula and Baraga, Marquette and Alger Counties, where Lake Superior contributes to lake-effect snow, making them a prominent part of the Midwestern snow belt. The Keweenaw Peninsula averages more snowfall than almost anywhere in the United States—more than anywhere east of the Mississippi River and most of all nonmountainous regions of the continental United States. Because of the howling storms across Lake Superior, which cause dramatic amounts of precipitation, the lake-effect snow is said to make the Keweenaw Peninsula the snowiest place east of the Rockies. Only one official weather station exists in this region. Farther north in the peninsula, lake-effect snow can occur with any wind direction. The road commission in Keweenaw County, Michigan, collects unofficial data in a community called Delaware, and it strictly follows the guidelines set forth by the National Weather Service. Herman, Michigan, averages  of snow every year. Lake-effect snow can cause blinding whiteouts in just minutes, and some storms can last days.

Western Michigan, western Northern Lower Michigan, and Northern Indiana can get heavy lake-effect snows as winds pass over Lake Michigan and deposit snows over Muskegon, Traverse City, Grand Rapids, Kalamazoo, New Carlisle, South Bend, and Elkhart, but these snows abate significantly before Lansing or Fort Wayne, Indiana. When winds become northerly or aligned between 330 and 390°, a single band of lake-effect snow may form, which extends down the length of Lake Michigan. This long fetch often produces a very intense, yet localized, area of heavy snowfall, affecting cities such as La Porte and Gary.

Lake-effect snow is uncommon in Detroit, Toledo, Milwaukee, and Chicago, because the region's dominant winds are from the northwest, making them upwind from their respective Great Lakes, although they, too, can see lake-effect snow during easterly or northeasterly winds. More frequently, the north side of a low-pressure system picks up more moisture over the lake as it travels east, creating a phenomenon called lake-enhanced precipitation.

Ontario, Canada 

Because Southwestern Ontario is surrounded by water on three sides, many parts of Southwestern and Central Ontario get a large part of their winter snow from lake-effect snow. This region is notorious for the whiteouts that can suddenly reduce highway visibility on North America’s busiest highway (Ontario Highway 401) from clear to zero. The region most commonly affected spans from Port Stanley in the west, the Bruce Peninsula in the north, Niagara-on-the-Lake to the east, and Fort Erie to the south. The heaviest accumulations usually happen in the Bruce Peninsula, which is between Lake Huron and Georgian Bay. So long as the Great Lakes are not frozen over, the only time the Bruce Peninsula does not get lake-effect snow is when the wind is directly from the south.

Toronto and Hamilton are usually spared lake-effect squalls because they are not on the leeward side of Lake Ontario during the dominant northwest winds. Some central and northern portions of the Greater Toronto Area, though, can be affected a few times each year by lake-effect snow from Georgian Bay. Downtown Toronto and Hamilton get most of their lake-effect snow when the wind comes from the southeast or east, over Lake Ontario. Such easterly winds are usually associated with a winter cyclone passing just to the south of the Great Lakes.

When the wind is from the north, the snowbelt runs north-south from Grand Bend to Sarnia and London. Areas such as Lucan and Kincardine have experienced some of the heaviest snowsqualls from Lake Huron in this region. When the wind is slightly more westerly, the snowbelt runs from Tobermory, Owen Sound, and Grand Bend to as far south and east as Arthur, Orangeville and Caledon. This snowbelt often reaches Kitchener and can affect the Halton and Peel regions of the Greater Toronto Area. These northwesterly winds usually also bring snow southeast of Georgian Bay, which can reach beyond Lake Scugog. A westerly wind sends lake-effect streamers east from Owen Sound to Gravenhurst, Barrie, and Orillia, and may even reach as far south and east as York Region in the Greater Toronto Area. When the wind is from the southwest, lake-effect streamers from Lake Huron and Georgian Bay run from Noelville to Sudbury, Gravenhurst, and Algonquin Provincial Park. Winds from this same direction coming over Lake Ontario cause squalls to come ashore from Cobourg through the Belleville area to Kingston and the Thousand Islands, with Prince Edward County being the area most vulnerable to extreme snowfall amounts. Some snow bands can occasionally reach Quebec and Maine, while snow originating from Lake Erie, Lake Ontario, and even Lake Michigan can impact southern Ontario. Easterly winds primarily affect the Niagara Peninsula. Local lake-effect snowsqualls can occasionally occur downwind of Lake Simcoe when the lake is unfrozen, usually in early winter or late fall.

Lake Superior has its own independent snowbelts, affecting Wawa, Sault Ste. Marie, Marathon, the Keweenaw Peninsula in Upper Michigan, and Pukaskwa National Park. Thunder Bay is usually not affected by lake-effect snow, unless it is associated with a winter storm.

Elsewhere in the United States 

The southern and southeastern sides of the Great Salt Lake receive significant lake-effect snow. Since the Great Salt Lake never freezes, the lake effect can influence the weather along the Wasatch Front year-round. The lake effect largely contributes to the  annual snowfall amounts recorded south and east of the lake, and in average snowfall reaching  in the Wasatch Range. The snow, which is often very light and dry because of the semiarid climate, is referred to as the "Greatest Snow on Earth" in the mountains. Lake-effect snow contributes to roughly six to eight snowfalls per year in Salt Lake City, with about 10% of the city's precipitation being contributed by the phenomenon.

Similar snowfall can occur near large inland bays, where it is known as bay-effect snow. Bay-effect snows fall downwind of Delaware Bay, Chesapeake Bay, and Massachusetts Bay when the basic criteria are met, and on rarer occasions along Long Island.

The Finger Lakes of New York are long enough for lake-effect precipitation.

The Texas twin cities of Sherman and Denison are known, in rare instances, to have experienced lake-effect snow from nearby Lake Texoma due to the lake's size (it is the third-largest lake in Texas or along its borders).

On one occasion in December 2016, lake-effect snow fell in central Mississippi from a lake band off Ross Barnett Reservoir.

Oklahoma City even had a band of lake-effect snow off of Lake Hefner in February 2018.

Owasso/Collinsville, Oklahoma outside of Tulsa, had lake effect snow off Lake Oolagah during a winter storm in February 2021.

The Truckee Meadows and other parts of northern Nevada, which are normally in the rain shadow of the Sierra Nevada, when conditions are right, can have severe snowfall as a result of lake effect from Lake Tahoe. Recent severe examples of this phenomenon have occurred as recently as 2004, dumping several feet of snow in the normally dry region.

The West Coast occasionally experiences ocean-effect showers, usually in the form of rain at lower elevations south of about the mouth of the Columbia River. These occur whenever an Arctic air mass from western Canada is drawn westward out over the Pacific Ocean, typically by way of the Fraser Valley, returning shoreward around a center of low pressure. Cold air flowing southwest from the Fraser Valley can also pick up moisture over the Strait of Georgia and Strait of Juan de Fuca, then rise over the northeastern slopes of the Olympic Mountains, producing heavy, localized snow between Port Angeles and Sequim, as well as areas in Kitsap County and the Puget Sound region.

While snow of any type is very rare in Florida, the phenomenon of gulf-effect snow has been observed along the northern coast of the Gulf of Mexico a few times in history. More recently, "ocean-effect" snow occurred on January 24, 2003, when wind off the Atlantic, combined with air temperatures in the 30 °F range, brought snow flurries briefly to the Atlantic Coast of northern Florida seen in the air as far south as Cape Canaveral.

Elsewhere in Canada 
Lake Winnipeg, Lake Manitoba and Lake Winnipegosis in Manitoba historically have seen lake-effect snow as early as late October, and it is common throughout early to mid-November. Towards the end of November, the lakes sufficiently cool and begin to freeze, ending the lake-effect snow. A brief period of lake-effect snow is also common near Great Bear Lake and Great Slave Lake in the Northwest Territories during early winter (usually early to mid-October); the lake-effect season for both lakes is very short, though. The lakes are frozen roughly eight months of the year, and as a result, have very little time to warm during the summer.

Other small lakes such as Lake Athabasca in northern Saskatchewan and Lake Nipigon in northwestern Ontario produce early-season lake-effect snows. Smallwood Reservoir, a man-made lake located in Labrador, has on occasion generated lake-effect snow.

The Canadian Maritimes, specifically Nova Scotia and Prince Edward Island, are often affected by such snow squalls when an Arctic winter airmass moves over unfrozen waters. In PEI, sea-effect snow is often generated when a cold north wind blows over the unfrozen Gulf of St. Lawrence, dumping heavy snow on the north shore. In Nova Scotia, a cold north-west wind can produce sea-effect snow over the Cape Breton Highlands from the Gulf of St. Lawrence, and the Annapolis Valley from the Bay of Fundy; in the latter case, the sea-effect snow season can continue all winter as the Bay of Fundy remains open owing to its extreme tidal currents.

The east coast of southern Vancouver Island, British Columbia, experiences occasional episodes of sea-effect snow during winter due to cold easterly outflow winds from the British Columbia interior, typically through the Fraser Valley, crossing the always open waters of the Strait of Georgia.

Eurasia 
In Eurasia, lake-effect or sea-effect snow occurs in the regions of the Black Sea in Georgia, Romania, Bulgaria and northern Turkey, the Caspian Sea in Iran, the Adriatic Sea in Italy, the North Sea, the Irish Sea, the Aegean Sea, the Balearic Islands, and the Baltic Sea, as well as areas surrounding the Sea of Japan.

Because the southern Black Sea is relatively warm (around 13 °C or 55 °F at the beginning of winter, typically 10 to 6 °C or 50 to 43 °F by the end), sufficiently cold air aloft can create significant snowfalls in a relatively short period of time. Due to its location on a peninsula between the Black Sea and the Sea of Marmara, Istanbul is very prone to lake-effect snow and this weather phenomenon occurs almost every winter. This type of precipitation is generated by the warmer Black Sea temperature and colder air temperature, over the Istanbul area. In February 2005, a lake-effect snowfall left  of snow cover, and in March 1987, a three-week-long lake-effect snowfall accompanied with strong winds (lake-effect blizzard) left  of snow cover in Istanbul. The snowfall in the eastern regions of the Black Sea is amplified by the orographic effect of the nearby Caucasus Mountains, often resulting in snowfall of several meters, especially at higher elevations.

In the Adriatic regions of Italy and in the eastern Apennine Mountains, the sea-effect snow phenomenon with air masses coming from Northern or Eastern Europe (and Russia) can be incredibly heavy and can last for days. In the hills and mountains, it can result in snowfalls of several meters, as it happened in February 2012. These huge amounts of snow can also fall in short periods of time.

In Northern Europe, cold, dry air masses from Russia can blow over the Baltic Sea and cause heavy snow squalls on areas of the southern and eastern coasts of Sweden, as well as on the Danish island of Bornholm, the east coast of Jutland and the northern coast of Poland. For the northern parts of the Baltic Sea, this happens mainly in the early winter, since it freezes later. Southeast Norway can also experience heavy sea snow events with east-north-easterly winds. Especially, coastal areas from Kragero to Kristiansand have had incredible snow depths in the past with intense persistent snowbands from Norwegian Sea (the coastal city of Arendal recorded  in a single week in late February 2007). Although Fennoscandia is lined with an abundance of lakes, this type of snowfall is rare in these, due to the shallow freshwater freezing early in the cold interiors. One notable exception happened in the middle of May 2008, as Leksand on the since-long unfrozen lake of Siljan got  on the ground.

The Sea of Japan creates snowfall in the mountainous western Japanese prefectures of Niigata and Nagano, parts of which are known collectively as snow country (Yukiguni). In addition to the Sea of Japan, other parts of Japan, as well as Korea and Shandong Peninsula, experience these same conditions.

Because the Aegean Sea (Greece), is warm in the winter, when cold air masses from Siberia advance in the area, they pick up much moisture, resulting in heavy snowfalls in eastern Central Greece, eastern Thessaly, eastern Peloponnese, south-eastern Chalkidiki, the Cyclades, and Crete (more commonly in the mountainous areas). In 2008, a severe snowstorm blanketed Athens, dropping  of snow and causing huge traffic jams.

Moving of polar or Siberian high-pressure centers along Caspian Sea regarding to relatively warmer water of this sea can make heavy snowfalls in the northern coast of Iran. Several blizzards have been reported in this region during the last decades. In February 2014, heavy snowfall reached  on the coastline in Gilan and Mazandaran provinces of Iran. The heaviest snowfall was reported in Abkenar village near Anzali Lagoon.

United Kingdom 
In the United Kingdom, easterly winds bringing cold continental air across the North Sea can lead to a similar phenomenon. Locally, it is also known as "lake-effect snow" despite the snow coming in from the sea rather than a lake. Similarly during a north-westerly wind, snow showers can form coming in from the Liverpool Bay, coming down the Cheshire gap, causing snowfall in the West Midlands—this formation resulted in the white Christmas of 2004 in the area, and most recently the heavy snowfall of 8 December 2017 and 30 January 2019. A similar phenomenon can affect the city of Inverness in the Scottish Highlands, where cold north-east winds cause heavy snow to form in the Moray Firth; this was the case with the White Hogmanay of 2009, which caused the street party to be cancelled. Northerly and north-westerly winds can cause the effect to occur over the Irish Sea and Bristol Channel feeding snow into South West England and eastern Ireland. Western Scotland and northern Ireland can also see snow showers from a north or north-westerly wind over the Atlantic.

The best-known example occurred in January 1987, when record-breaking cold air (associated with an upper low) moved across the North Sea towards the UK. The end result was over 2 ft of snow for coastal areas, leading to communities being cut off for over a week. The latest of these events to affect Britain's east coast occurred on November 30, 2017; February 28, 2018; and March 17, 2018; in connection with the 2018 Great Britain and Ireland cold wave. The second event of winter 2017/18 was particularly severe, with up to  falling in total over the 27th–28th.

Similarly, northerly winds blowing across the relatively warm waters of the English Channel during cold spells can bring significant snowfall to the French region of Normandy, where snow drifts exceeding 10 ft (3 m) were measured in March 2013.

See also 
 Horizontal convective rolls
 Ontario winter lake-effect systems
 Planetary boundary layer
 Sea smoke

Warnings about lake-effect snow:

United States:
 Lake effect snow advisory
 Lake effect snow watch
 Lake effect snow warning
 Severe weather terminology (United States)

Canada:
 Snowsquall warning
 Severe weather terminology (Canada)

References

External links 

 National Weather Service Official Lake Effect Page—based in Buffalo, NY
 Lake effect forecasting
 Video of a snowsquall timelapse while driving on Highway 407 ETR in Greater Toronto
 Digital Snow Museum
 Ice and snow measurements on lakes and surrounding land areas , Great Lakes Environmental Research Laboratory
 A BBC forecast of lake effect snow in the UK in 1991

Climatology
Snow or ice weather phenomena
Upper Peninsula of Michigan

fr:Bourrasque de neige#Bourrasques en aval de plans d'eau